The Muay Thai competitions at the 2017 Southeast Asian Games in Kuala Lumpur took place at MATRADE Exhibition and Convention Centre.

Medal table

Medalists

Men

References

External links
  

2017 Southeast Asian Games events
2017